Lypivka is a village (selo) in  western Ukraine. It is located in Ivano-Frankivsk Raion (district) of Ivano-Frankivsk Oblast (province), approximately 20 km south of the oblast capital, Ivano-Frankivsk. Lypivka belongs to Tysmenytsia urban hromada, one of the hromadas of Ukraine. 

Lypivka was previously referred to as Lackie Szlacheckie, as part of the Tłumacz Powiat (county). It is also a part of the historic region of Pokuttya in Galicia. The name is associated with Polish gentry who lived in the area.

Until 18 July 2020, Lypivka belonged to Tysmenytsia Raion. The raion was abolished in July 2020 as part of the administrative reform of Ukraine, which reduced the number of raions of Ivano-Frankivsk Oblast to six. The area of Tysmenytsia Raion was merged into Ivano-Frankivsk Raion.

References

Notes

Sources
Polish Declarations of Admiration: Inventory of Place Names,  L (Library of Congress)
Lackie Szlacheckie
Account card to villages

External links
Lackie Szlacheckie

Villages in Ivano-Frankivsk Raion